

References 
 

 Isle of Man
Geology of the Isle of Man
Fossiliferous stratigraphic units